The  was Japan's first Western-style skyscraper. It stood in the Asakusa district of City of Tokyo (now Taitō, Tokyo) from 1890 until its demolition following the Great Kanto earthquake of 1923.  The , as it was affectionately called by Tokyoites, was Tokyo's most popular attraction, and a showcase for new technologies. It housed Japan's first electric elevator.

History
The Ryōunkaku quickly became a landmark and symbol of Asakusa after its opening in 1890. It was a major leisure complex for visitors from all over Tokyo. When the 1894 Tokyo earthquake weakened the structure, it was reinforced with steel girders. However on September 1, 1923, the Great Kanto earthquake destroyed the upper floors and damaged the whole tower so severely, that it had to be demolished with explosives on September 23.

A supermarket stands on the former grounds of the Ryōunkaku, with a historic marker placed near its entrance. In 2018, a nearby construction project unearthed the bricks of the tower's original foundation. Once the industrial building was completed, a reproduction of an 1890 illustration of the Ryōunkaku by ukiyo-e painter Utagawa Kunimasa IV was added to its outside wall.

Architecture and technology
The Ryōunkaku was designed by Scottish engineer W. K. Burton in the late 1880s, not long after his arrival in Japan. All twelve floors had electric lighting. The two electric elevators were designed by Ichisuke Fujioka, a founder of Toshiba. They served the first through eighth floors, and could carry up to 10 persons each. However, for safety reasons, they were shut down after only half a year of operation.

Building uses
The Ryōunkaku's second through seventh floors held 46 stores selling goods from around the world. A lounge was on the eighth floor, and art exhibitions were held on the ninth floor. The tenth through twelfth floors were observation decks from which all of Tokyo could be seen, and on clear days, Mount Fuji. Many artistic and cultural events were held in the Ryōunkaku, including Western music concerts, geisha photograph exhibitions, and beauty contests. A well-known store was the place where wood-block prints were made for Sugoroku, a popular Japanese board game.

Ryōunkaku in literature

As the Ryōunkaku's fame spread, it appeared in the works of contemporary authors such as Tanizaki Junichiro, Ishikawa Takuboku, Kitahara Hakushu and Kaneko Mitsuharu. The edifice's opening was commemorated in Ogawa Kazumasa's most famous work, Types of Japan, Celebrated Geysha of Tokyo in Collotype and From Photographic Negatives Taken by Him, published around 1892.

Gallery

References

External links

Panoramic View from Observation Deck of Ryōunkaku
Ryōunkaku at the Vintage Japanese Postcard Museum
A film clip of the tower’s demolition

Towers completed in 1890
Skyscrapers in Tokyo
Former buildings and structures in Japan
Demolished buildings and structures in Japan
Buildings of the Meiji period
Retail buildings in Tokyo
1923 Great Kantō earthquake
Buildings and structures demolished in 1923